Philip Allen (December 2, 1832 – March 21, 1915) was a member of the Wisconsin State Assembly.

Biography
Allen was born on December 2, 1832 in Monroe County, Ohio; sources have differed on the exact location. Later, he resided in Elkhart, Indiana and eventually Cadiz, Wisconsin, where he lived on a farm. He died on March 21, 1915.

Political career
Allen was a member of the Assembly in 1889. Other positions he held include town superintendent of schools and town clerk of Cadiz. He was a Republican.

References

External links

People from Monroe County, Ohio
People from Elkhart, Indiana
People from Green County, Wisconsin
Republican Party members of the Wisconsin State Assembly
City and town clerks
School superintendents in Wisconsin
Farmers from Wisconsin
1832 births
1915 deaths
Educators from Ohio
Educators from Indiana